Nicaraguan cuisine includes a mixture of indigenous Native American cuisine, Spanish cuisine, and Creole cuisine. Despite the blending and incorporation of pre-Columbian and Spanish-influenced cuisine, traditional cuisine differs on the Pacific coast from the Caribbean coast. While the Pacific coast's main staple revolves around beef, poultry, local fruits, and corn, the Caribbean coast's cuisine makes use of seafood and coconut.

Cuisine

Main staples

As in many other Latin American countries, corn is a staple. It is used in many widely consumed dishes such as nacatamal and indio viejo. Corn is not only used in food; it is also an ingredient for drinks such as pinolillo and chicha as well as in sweets and desserts. Other staples are rice and beans. Rice is eaten when corn is not, and beans are consumed as a cheap protein by the majority of Nicaraguans. It is common for rice and beans to be eaten as a breakfast dish. There are many meals including these two staples; one popular dish, gallo pinto, is often served as lunch, sometimes with eggs. Nicaraguans do not limit their diet solely to corn, rice, and beans. Many Nicaraguans have small gardens of their own full of vegetables and sometimes incorporate flowers into their meals.

Commonly used ingredients are peanuts, cabbage (shredded in vinegar, this is called "ensalada" and used as a side dish, sometimes with carrots and beets added), carrots, beets, butternut squash, plantains, bananas, fresh ginger, onion, potato, peppers, jocote, grosella, mimbro, mango, papaya, tamarind, pipian, apples, avocado, yuca, and quequisque. Herbs such as cilantro, oregano, and achiote are also used in cooking.

Typical Nicaraguan dishes

Beverages

Refrescos (drinks)

Nicaraguan cuisine makes use of fruits, some of which are only grown in that particular region due to their location. Many fruits are made into drinks known as frescos, the Nicaraguan name for what are called "aguas frescas" in other Latin American countries. Common flavors include melon, tamarind, papaya, guayaba, guanábana, coconut, pineapple, and pitahaya. Pinolillo is very popular among Nicaraguans, as many times they refer to themselves as pinoleros, which means "pinolillo drinkers". Many drinks are also made from grains and seeds, mixed with milk, water, sugar and ice.

Alcoholic beverages 
Rums, such as Flor de Caña and Ron Plata (both produced by Compañía Licorera de Nicaragua, S.A (CLNSA)), are both a popularly consumed beverage in Nicaragua and a crucial export product.

Popular rum-based cocktails include the "Nica libre," a regional re-naming of the Cuba libre (itself a variation of rum and coke), and the "Macuá" (containing orange, guava, and lime juices). The "Macúa" originated in 2006, when it won a Flor de Caña-sponsored competition to determine a marketable national cocktail representing Nicaragua, and was created by a pediatrician from Granada.

Beer is also a common alcoholic beverage consumed in Nicaragua. Popular brands include Toña and Victoria, two former competitors both now produced by Compañía Cervecera de Nicaragua, as of a 1996 merger.

Other drinks 

 Achiote con limon
 Achiote con toronja
 Agua de arroz
 Arroz con Pino
 Arroz con piña
 Atol
 Avena (drink)
 Avena con leche
 Avena con limon
 Cacao
 Caimito
 Cebada
 Cebada con limon
 Cebada con Milca
 Coyolito
 Chia
 Chicha
 Chicha bruja
 Chicha de caña
 Chicha de coyol
 Chicha de jocote
 Chocolate
 Ensalada de fruta
 Espinaca (made with spinach berries)
 Fresco de guayabilla
 Guabul
 Granadilla
 Horchata 
 Kola Shaler
 Limonada cimarrona
 Linaza
 Linaza con tamarindo
 Mamey (nothing to do with sapodilla)
 Mamón
 Nancite (yellow cherries drink)
 Naranja con remolachas
 Naranja con zanahorias
 Papalon (beach grape drink)
 Papaturro
 Tiste

Postres (desserts) 

 Almendras en miel (en jarabe)
 Almibar o curbaza
 Almibar de toncuá
 Arroz con leche
 Atol
 Atol pujagua
 Atolillo
 Ayote en miel
 Bienmesabe
 Botellitas de miel
 Brujas
 Buñuelos de yuca o platano
 Cajeta de ajonjoli
 Cajeta de coco
 Cajeta de coyol
 Cajeta de leche
 Cajeta de piña
 Cajeta de zapoyol
 Cocadas
 Cosa de horno
 Coyol en miel (en jarabe)
 Crispeta
 Cuznaca
 Chiricaya
 Dulce de leche
 Dulce de limon (cidra)
 Dulce de nancite
 Dulce de naranja
 Dulce de piña
 Dulce de papaya
 Dulce de toronja
 Dulce de remolacha con zanahoria
 Enchiclados
 Espumillas
 Gofio
 Flan
 Gofio con anis
 Grosellas en miel (en jarabe)
 Hicacos en miel (en jarabe)
 Jalea de guayaba
 Jalea de mango
 Jalea de patriotas (bananas)
 Jocotes cocidos
 Leche burra
 Maduro asado
 Maduro en gloria
 Maduro horneado
 Mamones en miel (en jarabe)
 Mazapan
 Melcocha
 Motas de atol
 Nancites cocidos
 Nancites en conserva
 Perrerreque
 Piñonate
 Pio Quinto
 Polvorón
 Raspados
 Requeson
 Sopa borracha
 Suspiros
 Toronja en miel (en jarabe)
 Torta de leche
 Tres leches cake
 Turron

See also

 Latin American cuisine

References

External links
 Traditional Nicaraguan food
 Nicaraguan Food recipes

 
Central American cuisine
Latin American cuisine
Mesoamerican cuisine